WMEB may refer to:

 WMEB-FM, a radio station (91.9 FM) licensed to Orono, Maine, United States
 WMEB-TV, a television station (channel 12 analog/9 digital) licensed to Orono, Maine, United States